Moonshot is a 2022 American science-fiction romantic comedy film directed by Chris Winterbauer and written by Max Taxe. It stars Cole Sprouse, Lana Condor, Mason Gooding, Emily Rudd, and Zach Braff. The plot follows a college student (Condor) who helps a barista (Sprouse) sneak on board a space shuttle to Mars. The film was released on HBO Max on March 31, 2022, and was removed from the service in August.

Plot
In 2049, Walt works as a barista on a college campus. His dream to go to space becomes attainable with the introduction of the Kovi Industries Student Mars Program, an organization that sends college students to Mars. The program, however, has rejected his offer 37 times due to his lack of knowledge and expertise to further humanity's exploration of the Red Planet. At a college party, he accidentally breaks the Wifi-orb of Sophie, a no-nonsense  student, whose boyfriend, Calvin, is on Mars. While at the party, he also falls in love with another student, Ginny, who is sent to Mars the next morning.

A few weeks later, Sophie appears at Walt's cafe in tears due to Calvin accepting a longer stay on Mars, so Walt convinces her to buy a ticket to travel on the next shuttle launch. As she approaches the launch gate, Walt manipulates her into helping him sneak on board a space shuttle by pretending to be a family member but freaks out when they must claim to be in a relationship on board the shuttle to keep his identity secret.

Over the course of the trip to Mars, the two grow closer; Walt learns more about Calvin as he claims his identity, and Sophie learns the real Calvin may have been putting her second behind his dreams of terraforming Mars to become more hospitable. During an onboard presentation, Walt is forced to give a presentation about terraforming, a topic he knows nothing about, but convinces two passengers to get married as his speech about love moves the audience, Sophie included.

As the shuttle approaches Mars, she tells him that she is staying with Calvin and will not help him get to Mars anymore, causing Walt to call her a coward. On Mars, Sophie and Calvin reunite while security arrests Walt. Awaiting his trial, Ginny tells Walt that she found someone new on Mars due to their one-night romance and his subsequent need to find her too off-putting for her to handle. The next day, Walt meets the leader of the Mars program, Leon Kovi, who tells Walt that his company knew about everything he was doing through security cameras on the shuttle and let it slide as a security test, with the program's board of trustees planning to sue Walt once he returned to Earth. Due to his dislike of the board, Kovi had leaked the security footage back on Earth which went viral online. To avoid backlash, Leon offers Walt a contract to avoid any legal problems and stay on Mars if he promotes the company, to which Walt agrees.

As his life as a barista and online sensation unfold, Walt realizes he is not happy living on Mars. Similarly, realizing she has grown apart from Calvin and his goals, Sophie breaks up with him and boards a ship back to Earth. Seeing his life becoming a pawn for Kovi, Walt also boards the shuttle back to Earth, where he reunites with Sophie and the two share a kiss.

Cast

 Cole Sprouse as Walt
 Lana Condor as Sophie Tsukino
 Mason Gooding as Calvin
 Emily Rudd as Ginny
 Christine Adams as Jan
 Michelle Buteau as Captain Tarter
 Zach Braff as Leon Kovi
 Cameron Esposito as Tabby
 Sunita Deshpande as Celeste
 Davey Johnson as Earl
 Lukas Gage as Dalton

In addition, Peter Woodward provides the voice of Gary the robot.

Production
Moonshot is the second film in a four-film deal between HBO Max and the production company Berlanti-Schechter Films. It was shot in Atlanta, Georgia.

Release
The film was released on HBO Max on March 31, 2022. It was originally scheduled for March 24.

Reception
On the review aggregator website Rotten Tomatoes, 64% of 28 critics' reviews are positive, with an average rating of 5.9/10. The website's critical consensus reads, "It's surprisingly ordinary for a romcom set in space, but Lana Condor's performance helps Moonshot hit the target more often than not." Metacritic, which uses a weighted average, assigned the film a score of 58 out of 100 based on seven critics, indicating "mixed or average reviews". While some critics called the film predictable, others said it was entertaining and worth watching. They also praised the performances of Sprouse and Condor as well as Winterbauer's direction.

See also
List of films set on Mars

References

External links
 

2022 romantic comedy films
2022 science fiction films
2020s English-language films
2020s science fiction comedy films
American romantic comedy films
American science fiction comedy films
American science fiction romance films
Films produced by Greg Berlanti
Films set on spacecraft
Mars in film
Films set in 2049
Films shot in Atlanta
HBO Max films
New Line Cinema films
Warner Bros. films
2020s American films